Potamus is an anglicization of the Ancient Greek potamos (ποταμός) meaning river or stream; it appears in the name: Mesopotamia ("Between the Rivers").

Potamus may also refer to:
 A hippopotamus, or its calf 
 Peter Potamus, an animated purple hippopotamus
 A lightweight GTK-based audio player
 The song Hiphopopotamus vs. Rhymenoceros, on Flight of the Conchords' eponymous album

Potamos may also refer to:
 an old settlement on the Ionian island of Corfu
 the most populated village on the Ionian island of Kythira
 a small village on the South Aegean island of Therasia
 an archeological site near Akrotiri, on the Greek island of Santorini
 a character in the Wedding Peach franchise

Potamus or Potamus may also refer to:
 Potamus (Attica), demoi of ancient Attica, Greece
 Potamus Deiradiotes, a deme of ancient Attica, Greece
 Potamus Hypenerthen, a deme of ancient Attica, Greece
 Potamus Kathyperthen, a deme of ancient Attica, Greece